Battagram is a district in Abaseen Division of Khyber Pakhtunkhwa province in Pakistan. The headquarter is Battagram, which is about 75-km from Mansehra.

Overview and history 
The district of Battagram is located at the latitude of 34.41 and longitude 73.1. It is surrounded by Kohistan District to the north, Mansehra District to the east, Kala Dhaka (now Torghar District) to the south and Shangla District to the west.

It has a total land area of 1301 square kilometres. Battagram obtained the status of district in July 1993 when it was upgraded from a Tehsil and separated from Mansehra District.

Demographics 
At the time of the 2017 census the district had a population of 476,749, of which 238,402 were males and 238,312 females. The entire population was rural. The literacy rate was 36.31% - the male literacy rate was 53.81% while the female literacy rate was 19.36%. 161 people in the district were from religious minorities.

At the time of the 2017 census, 82.19% of the population spoke Pashto and 2.87% Hindko as their first language. 14.32% of the population spoke a language recorded as 'Other' on the census, mainly Kohistani languages.

Administration
The district has geographical borders with the districts of Kohistan to the north, Mansehra to the east and southeast, Torghar to the south and Shangla to the west. The district consists of two sub-divisions or Tehsils, containing 20 in total. Union Councils:

Provincial Assembly

2005 earthquake

Battagram was one of the areas affected by the Pakistan earthquake of October 8, 2005 when more than 4,500 people were killed and approximately 35,000 were injured. Many residents of the area were rendered homeless and without shelter. Since October 8, 2005, the NGOs and the governmental organization Earthquake Reconstruction and Rehabilitation Authority have been engaged in reconstruction work but as of 2009, the reconstruction work is not completed. In some cases residents have rebuilt houses themselves.

References

Bibliography

 
Districts of Khyber Pakhtunkhwa